Jeremy McGrath Supercross is a racing video game video game series published by Acclaim Sports. The first game was a joint development by Atod and Probe Entertainment before Acclaim Studios Salt Lake City took over developing the next two games. After Acclaim went bankrupt in 2005, 2XL Games developed the recent entry in the series called Jeremy McGrath's Offroad.

Games

Jeremy McGrath Supercross 98 (1998)

Information needed

Jeremy McGrath Supercross 2000 (2000)

Information needed

Jeremy McGrath Supercross World (2001)

Information needed

Jeremy McGrath's Offroad (2012)

Information needed

References

External links
 

Video game franchises
Video game franchises introduced in 1998